Cerulean Lake is located in Glacier National Park, in the U. S. state of Montana. Melt from Rainbow Glacier to the west enters Cerulean lake via Rainbow Creek and other sources.

See also
List of lakes in Flathead County, Montana (M-Z)

References

Lakes of Glacier National Park (U.S.)
Lakes of Flathead County, Montana